The Josh Carrick Foundation is a British charity established in 2012, dedicated to testicular cancer awareness and fundraising research into treatment. It was set up by the family of Josh Carrick, who died of the disease in October 2011 at the age of 23.

Josh Carrick

Josh Carrick, from Luton, was the son of Steve and Arlene Carrick and the twin brother of Dominic. He was a computer science graduate from the University of Nottingham who was offered his dream job at IBM shortly before his diagnosis. He initially felt a backache in August 2010, attributing it to a long drive. When it did not ease, he had tests which suggested a kidney infection and was prescribed antibiotics, but in September an x-ray diagnosed testicular cancer. Twelve weeks later, after chemotherapy, he was free of symptoms, but by February 2011 they began again. Around Easter it was discovered that the cancer had metastasised to his spine and brain; stronger chemotherapy and a stem cell transplant ended the cancer for a second time. He then had monthly blood tests, and the September one showed that the disease was now incurable. He died in October.

Foundation
The charity was set up in October 2012, and had raised £50,000 by October 2013. By March 2016 it had raised more than £300,000. It works together with Cancer Research UK, IBM, and the University of Nottingham. IBM offers £100 to the best first-year student in the university's Computer Science department, and offers visits to their laboratories for the top five. The money raised for Cancer Research UK has funded a study on the link between testicular cancer survivors and cardiovascular disease, and a laboratory for a metastasis specialist. A bicycle ride from London to Brighton raised £22,000.

British Prime Minister David Cameron awarded Steve and Arlene Carrick the 496th and 497th Points of Light, a daily award for charity fundraisers. The charity has been highlighted in national newspapers. It was the charity of choice at the 2015 RESI Awards.

References

External links
Official website

2012 establishments in England
Cancer awareness